RTV silicone (room-temperature-vulcanizing silicone) is a type of silicone rubber that cures at room temperature. It is available as a one-component product, or mixed from two-components (a base and curative). Manufacturers provide it in a range of hardnesses from very soft to medium—usually from 15 to 40 Shore A. RTV silicones can be cured with a catalyst consisting of either platinum or a tin compound such as dibutyltin dilaurate. Applications include low-temperature over-molding, making molds for reproducing, and lens applications for some optically clear grades. It is also used widely in the automotive industry as an adhesive/sealant, for example to create gaskets in-place.

Chemistry 
RTV silicones are made from a mixtures of silicone polymers, fillers, and organoreactive silane catalysts. Silicones are formed from a Si-O bond, but can have a wide variety of side chains. The silicone polymers are often made by reacting dimethyl dichlorosilane with water.

Fillers such as acetic acid can provide a fast cure time, while oxides and nitrides can provide better thermal conductivity. Tack-free times are typically on the order of minutes, with cure times on the order of hours.

One-component silicone 
One-part silicones make use of moisture in the atmosphere to cure from the outside towards the center. The time to cure will decrease with an increase in temperature, humidity and surface area to volume ratio.

Two-component silicone 
Two-part silicones use moisture in the second component as well as a cross-linker such as active alkoxy to cure the silicone in a process called condensation curing. Two-part silicones can also be platinum catylized in a "addition" reaction. Other reactive species to facilitate cross-linking include acetoxy, amine, octoate, and ketoxime.

Applications
To produce the material, a user mixes silicone rubber with the curing agent or vulcanizing agent. Usually, the mixing ratio is a few percent. For RTV silicone to reproduce surface textures, the original must be clean. Vacuum de-airing removes entrained air bubbles from the mixed silicone and catalyst to ensure optimal tensile strength, which affects reproduction times. In casting and mold-making, RTV silicone rubber reproduces fine details and is suitable for a variety of industrial and art-related applications including  prototypes, furniture, sculpture, and architectural elements. RTV silicone rubber can be used to cast materials including wax, gypsum, low melt alloys/metals and urethane, epoxy or polyester resins (without using a release agent). A more recent innovation is the ability to 3D print RTV silicones. RTV silicones' industrial applications include aviation, aerospace, consumer electronics, and microelectronics. Some aviation and aerospace product applications are cockpit instruments, engine electronics potting, and engine gasketing. RTV silicones are used for their ability to withstand mechanical and thermal stress.

Features
 Good characteristics of easy operation
 Light viscosity and good flow-ability
 Low shrinkage
 Favorable tension
 No deformation
 Favorable hardness
 High-temperature resistance, acid and alkali resistance, and ageing resistance

Advantages and disadvantages
RTV silicone rubber has excellent release properties compared to mold rubbers, which is especially an advantage when doing production casting of resins (polyurethane, polyester, and epoxy). No release agent is required, obviating post-production cleanup. Silicones also exhibit good chemical resistance and high-temperature resistance (205 °C, 400 °F and higher). For this reason, silicone molds are suitable for casting low-melt metals and alloys (e.g. zinc, tin, pewter, and Wood's metal). 

RTV silicone rubbers are, however, generally expensive--especially platinum-cure. They are also sensitive to substances (sulfur-containing modelling clay such as Plastilina, for example) that may prevent the silicone from curing (referred to as cure inhibition). Silicones are usually very thick (high viscosity), and must be vacuum degassed prior to pouring, to minimize bubble entrapment. If making a brush-on rubber mold, the curing time factor between coats is long (longer than urethanes or polysulfides, shorter than latex). Silicone components (A+B) must be mixed accurately by weight (scale required) or they do not work. Tin catalyst silicone shrinks somewhat and does not have a long shelf life. Acetoxysilane-based RTV releases acetic acid during the curing process, and this can attack solder joints, detaching the solder from the copper wire.

References

Elastomers
Sculpture materials
Silicones